Tabagne is a town in northeastern Ivory Coast. It is a sub-prefecture of Bondoukou Department in Gontougo Region, Zanzan District.

Tabagne was a commune until March 2012, when it became one of 1126 communes nationwide that were abolished.

 In 2014, the population of the sub-prefecture of Tabagne was 16,970.

Villages
The nineteen villages of the sub-prefecture of Tabagne and their population in 2014 are:

Notes

Sub-prefectures of Gontougo
Former communes of Ivory Coast